Our Lady of Arabia (Latin: Domina Nostra de Arabia, Regina Pacis) is a Catholic title of the Blessed Virgin Mary holding a Rosary and the Child Jesus as venerated in Kuwait and Bahrain by its faithful devotees. Under this venerated Marian title, she is designated as the patroness of the Apostolic Vicariates of Northern and Southern Arabia.

Pope Pius XII decreed the Marian title as Patroness of Kuwait via Regnum Mariæ on 25 January 1957. Pope John XXIII granted a canonical coronation to the venerated image on 9 January 1960. The rite of coronation was executed by the Archbishop of Bombay, Cardinal Valerian Gracias on 25 March 1960. 

The Congregation for Divine Worship and the Discipline of the Sacraments proclaimed her patroness of the Apostolic Vicariate of Northern Arabia and designated the feast of the image on the Saturday preceding the Second Sunday of Ordinary Time with the permission to celebrate it also on Friday or Sunday on 5 January 2011.

History

The original image is derived from an image of Our Lady of Mount Carmel brought to Al Ahmadi, Kuwait on 1 May 1948. On the Feast of the Immaculate Conception 1948, the priest, Father Teofano Ubaldo Stella of the Carmelite Order had it framed and brought out for veneration. In 1949, the Legion of Mary used their own image of Miraculous Medal, which encouraged Father Stella to commission an image in Italy under the sculpting company Rosa and Zanzio Ditta to carve a statue of the Madonna and Child using a cedar of Lebanon. The image was brought to Pope Pius XII who also venerated the image and authorised its Marian title.

On Orthodox Christmas, 6 January 1950, the statue was returned to Kuwait for public veneration by the faithful.

In 1954, Kuwaiti soldiers travelled to Rome for the hundredth anniversary of the Dogma of the Immaculate Conception, and presented another replica of the image at the Parish of Saint Teresa in Rome. On 16 September 1954, the same image was brought to Pope Pius XII, who blessed the statue at Castel Gandolfo. In May 1956, Pius XII sent a special candle to the new parish built in Ahmadi, especially chosen by him from that year's Candlemas ceremonies in Rome.
 
In 1956, Bishop Stella petitioned the Holy See to proclaim the Blessed Virgin Mary under the title of Our Lady of Arabia as Patroness of Kuwait. Pope Pius XII granted his consent via the papal bull Regnum Mariae on 25 January 1957. A solid gold crown studded with precious rubies and diamonds was crafted and then brought to Rome, where Pope John XXIII personally blessed it on 17 March 1960. Bishop Stella donated a particular pearl to the crown as well.

The canonical coronation was further authorised by Pope John XXIII, which occurred on 25 March 1960 via the Papal legate Cardinal Valerian Gracias of Bombay. on 5 January 2011, Pope Benedict XVI approved the patronage by assigning the Marian title was the principal patroness for the Apostolic Vicariates of Kuwait and the Apostolic Vicariate of Arabia, which were later renamed as Apostolic Vicariate of Northern Arabia and Apostolic Vicariate of Southern Arabia.

A smaller replica of the venerated Marian image is also enshrined at the capital city of Holy Family Cathedral, Kuwait.

Pontifical approbations
 Pope Pius XII — authorised the devotion to the statue on 17 December 1949 at the Apostolic Palace, to which he also consented to be photographed venerating the image. The same pontiff made the Marian title Patroness of the Arabian Peninsula on 25 January 1957 via the papal bull “Regnum Mariæ”.
 Pope John XXIII — issued a papal bull granting her canonical coronation on 25 March 1960 via the Archbishop of Bombay, Cardinal Valerian Gracias. The pontifical document was signed by Cardinal Domenico Tardini dated 9 January 1960 and formally notarized by the Guardian Chancellor of Apostolic Briefs, Monsignor Gildo Brugnola.
 Pope Benedict XVI — formally granted a request for audience to the first ambassador of Bahrain on 18 December 2008. He later approved the Marian title as Patroness for the Apostolic Vicariate of Arabia (which was later renamed to Apostolic Vicariate of Southern Arabia) on 5 January 2011.

Cathedral 

The king of Bahrain, Hamad bin Isa Al Khalifa, granted the Roman Catholic community in Bahrain around 9,000 square metres of land in Awali to build a new church. The announcement of the news was formally conveyed to the Apostolic Vicar of Northern Arabia, Bishop Camillo Ballin on 11 February 2013.

The same monarch later presented a model of the proposed church structure to Pope Francis on 19 May 2014 during a private papal audience at the Apostolic Palace in Rome. Accordingly, a cathedral dedicated to the image now serves as the bishopric headquarters for the Apostolic Vicariate of Northern Arabia.

References

Catholic spirituality
Marian devotions
Catholic Church in Kuwait
Catholic Church in Bahrain
Catholic devotions
Catholic Mariology
Titles of Mary
Apostolic Vicariate of Northern Arabia
Apostolic Vicariate of Southern Arabia
Catholic Church in the Arabian Peninsula